is a Japanese film directed by Santa Yamagishi, starring Rika Adachi and based on the manga of the same name by Volvox Sumikawa. It was released in Japan by Kadokawa Pictures on 4 February 2017.

Cast
Rika Adachi as Mai Kasai
 as Shino Odagiri
 as Yuria Fujizuka
 as Shizuku Natori
 as Tada Kuroki
 Koji Kominami as Atsushi Tōma

References

External links
 

Live-action films based on manga
Kadokawa Daiei Studio films
Films about bullying
2010s Japanese films